The 1904 Vermont gubernatorial election took place on September 6, 1904. Incumbent Republican John G. McCullough, per the "Mountain Rule", did not run for re-election to a second term as Governor of Vermont. Republican candidate Charles J. Bell defeated Democratic candidate Eli H. Porter to succeed him.

Results

References

Vermont
1904
Gubernatorial
September 1904 events